Kost is an unincorporated community in Chisago County, in the U.S. state of Minnesota.

History
Ferdinand A. Kost built a local gristmill in 1883, and gave the surrounding community its name. A post office was established at Kost in 1884, and remained in operation until it was discontinued in 1903.

References

Unincorporated communities in Chisago County, Minnesota
Unincorporated communities in Minnesota